The former Roman Catholic Metropolitan Archdiocese of Eauze (Latin Elusa), in Aquitaine, south-west France, existed from circa 300 to 879.

Its Ancient cathedral was so utterly destroyed it hasn't even been located. The present Eauze Cathedral, dedicated to St. Luperculus, was built around 500 and became co-cathedral of the successor see Archdiocese of Auch in 1864.

History 
Elusa, capital of the Gallic Late Roman province of Novempopulania since Emperor Diocletian split if off from Gallia Aquitania, was also made its Metropolitan Archbishopric, plausibly soon after. Eauze remained known as Elusa in the early Middle Ages. 
 
Its suffragan sees were, as attested in 506 at a council in Agde : Diocese of Auch, Diocese of Aire, Diocese of Bazas, Diocese of Dax, Diocese of Comminges, Diocese of Couserans, Diocese of Lectoure, Diocese of Lescar, Diocese of Oloron and Diocese of Tarbes. It 551 the Metropolitan hosted a synod in Euze attended by eight of his suffragans.

Historians dispute if the city itself was wrecked by Saracen incursion from Iberia in 721–722 or by 9th century Viking raids, but the bishopric was abandoned by mid 8th century.
 
The see may have been moved for mainly military reasons, around 850. It was suppressed in 879. The see was moved from Eauze to Auch, the territory becoming part of the diocese of Auch, whose Bishop Airardus was hence promoted and granted the title of Archbishop in 879.

Residential Archbishops 
The first historical mention of an (anonymous) bishop of Eauze is at the Council of Arles (314). Tradition assigns its foundation to a Saint Paternus, consecrated by Saint Saturninus, the apostle of the present Gers department. His four alleged successors (Saint Servandus, Saint Optatus, Saint Pompidianus and Taurinus) are only known from an AD 1106 document from the church of Auch (its successor), which claims the last transferred the see to Auch after the Vandals would have wrecked the city and ignores the later Metropolitans (except perhaps confounding Taurinus).

Apart from those, the Metropolitans and their (often disputed) historical record dates are :
 Mamertinus recorded in 314
 Clarus in 506
 Leontius in 511
 Saint Aspasius first in 533 - last in 551
 Labanus first in 573 - death circa 585 
 Desiderius = Désidère (circa 585 – ?614)
 Leodomundus in 614
 Senoc(us) first term until 622
 Palladius in 626
 Sidocus (if not identical to Senoc) in 627
 Senoc(us) (or Sidocus) in 627, presumably second term until death 660
 Scupilius = Scupilio in 673/675)
 Paterne = Paternus (? – 722)
 Taurin(us) (? – 829?) would have translated the see to - and become Bishop of Auch (836? – ?).

See also 
 List of Catholic dioceses in France
 Catholic Church in France

References

Sources and external links 
 GCatholic

Bibliography - Reference works
  (Use with caution; obsolete)
 (in Latin) 
 (in Latin)

Bibliography - Studies 

Former Roman Catholic dioceses in France
879 disestablishments
9th-century establishments in France